Well Done (in Italian A Regola d'Arte) is a 2016 Italian dramatic short film directed by Riccardo Di Gerlando.

Synopsis
A young man with Down syndrome goes to visit an art museum and will be fascinated by a symbolic picture.

Awards
Well Done has been screened in over 20 film festivals worldwide. It won the following awards: 
Best Movie Bluenose Ability Film Festival (BAFF) – Halifax, Nova Scotia (Canada)
Best Movie Kids Section XI° Edizione Corto Villese – (Bergamo, Italia)
Best Story Corto Corrente Festival – Fiumicino (Roma, Italia)
Best Scenography Festival del Cinema Nuovo – Gorgonzola (Milano, Italia)
Best Movie Zero Budget NOFI International Film Festival – Glendale (California, USA)
Audience Award CineGiovani e Adulti Film Festival – Treppo Carnico (Udine, Italia)
2° Place International Independent FF Publicystyka – Kędzierzyn-Koźle (Poland)
2° Place Francavilla Film Festival – Francavilla by Sicilia (Messina, Italia)
3° Place Gioiosa in Corto – Gioiosa Marea (Messina, Italia)
National Award Alberto Andronico – Roma (Italia)
Special Mention YouTube Short Film Festival – Roma (Italia)

References

External links

2010s Italian-language films
Italian drama films
Italian short films
2010s Italian films